is a former Japanese football player.

Playing career
Mukojima was born in Fujieda on May 5, 1976. After graduating from Shizuoka Gakuen High School, he joined Nagoya Grampus Eight in 1995. On August 9, 1997, he debuted against Kashima Antlers. However he could hardly play in the match in 3 seasons until 1997. In 1998, he moved to Honda. He became a regular player and the club won the champions in 2001, 2002 and 2006. He retired end of 2006 season.

Club statistics

References

External links

1976 births
Living people
Association football people from Shizuoka Prefecture
Japanese footballers
J1 League players
Japan Football League (1992–1998) players
Japan Football League players
Nagoya Grampus players
Honda FC players
Association football defenders
People from Fujieda, Shizuoka